Mongol, also known as Mwakai, is a Keram language of Papua New Guinea. Despite the name, it is not related to Mongolian, which is spoken in East Asia.

It is spoken in Mongol village, Keram Rural LLG, East Sepik Province.

Phonology

References

Further reading 
 Barlow, Russell (2020). Notes on Mwakai, East Sepik Province, Papua New Guinea. Language and Linguistics in Melanesia 38: 37-99. 

Languages of East Sepik Province
Mongol–Langam languages